New Chicago (formerly, Chicago) is an unincorporated community in Amador County, California. Its population is 25.

References

External links

Unincorporated communities in California
Unincorporated communities in Amador County, California